Price is an unincorporated community in northern Rockingham County, North Carolina, United States, located on U.S. Route 220/Future Interstate 73.

References

Unincorporated communities in North Carolina
Unincorporated communities in Rockingham County, North Carolina